The Arab Revolt was a 1916–1918 revolt led by sharif Hussein bin Ali against Ottoman rule. The term may also refer to:
Syrian Peasant Revolt (1834–1835)
Peasants' revolt in Palestine
Alawite revolt (1834–1835)
Iraqi revolt against the British, 1920
Great Syrian Revolt or Syrian Arab Revolt of 1924–1927
1936–1939 Arab revolt in Palestine
1979 Khuzestan insurgency
Arab Spring, 2010–2012
Arab Winter, 2012–present
Arab Summer, 2018–present